David Ralph Augustine (born November 28, 1949) is  an American former outfielder in Major League Baseball who played for the Pittsburgh Pirates during the 1973 and 1974 baseball seasons.

External links
, or Retrosheet, or Pura Pelota (Venezuelan Winter League)

1949 births
Living people
Baseball players from West Virginia
Cardenales de Lara players
Charleston Charlies players
Columbus Clippers players
Gastonia Pirates players
Gulf Coast Pirates players
Florida Instructional League Pirates players
Hawaii Islanders players
Major League Baseball outfielders
Miami Dade College alumni
Miami Dade Sharks baseball players
Navegantes del Magallanes players
Omaha Royals players
People from Follansbee, West Virginia
Pittsburgh Pirates players
Portland Beavers players
Salem Rebels players
Sherbrooke Pirates players
American expatriate baseball players in Venezuela